Jayhawk-Linn High School is a public secondary school in Mound City, Kansas, United States, operated by Unified School District 346. It serves students of grades 7 to 12. The school's sports teams are the Jayhawks and they compete as class 2A in the Three Rivers League.

References

External links
 Official website

Public high schools in Kansas
Linn County, Kansas